Lyutchina is a rural locality in Dyakonovsky Selsoviet Rural Settlement, Oktyabrsky District, Kursk Oblast, Russia. Population:

Geography 
The village is located on the Vorobzha River (a left tributary of the Seym River), 68 km from the Russia–Ukraine border, 20 km south-west of Kursk, 6 km south-west of the district center – the urban-type settlement Pryamitsyno, 1 km from the selsoviet center – Dyakonovo.

 Climate
Lyutchina has a warm-summer humid continental climate (Dfb in the Köppen climate classification).

Transport 
Lyutchina is located 3 km from the road of regional importance  ("Crimea Highway" – Ivanino, part of the European route ), 4.5 km from the road  (Dyakonovo – Sudzha – border with Ukraine), on the road of intermunicipal significance  (a part of the selo Dyakonovo: 4th Okolotok – Zhuravlinsky, Zhuravlino – Asphalt plant of Oktyabrsky District), 6.5 km from the nearest railway station Dyakonovo (railway line Lgov I — Kursk).

The rural locality is situated 31 km from Kursk Vostochny Airport, 114 km from Belgorod International Airport and 230 km from Voronezh Peter the Great Airport.

References

Notes

Sources

Rural localities in Oktyabrsky District, Kursk Oblast